Ahamed Lebbe Maraikkar Athaullah is a Sri Lankan politician. He is a representative of Ampara for the United People's Freedom Alliance in the Parliament of Sri Lanka, and was the Minister of Water Supply and Drainage.

See also
Minister of Local Government and Provincial Councils

References
 

Sri Lankan educators
Living people
Members of the 11th Parliament of Sri Lanka
Members of the 12th Parliament of Sri Lanka
Members of the 13th Parliament of Sri Lanka
Members of the 14th Parliament of Sri Lanka
Members of the 16th Parliament of Sri Lanka
Local government and provincial councils ministers of Sri Lanka
Sri Lanka Muslim Congress politicians
United People's Freedom Alliance politicians
1957 births
National Congress (Sri Lanka) politicians